Copper City, California may refer to:
Copper City, Glenn County, California
Copper City, San Bernardino County, California
Copper City, Shasta County, California